The given name Bismarck is shared by:

 Bismarck Barreto Faria (born 1969), Brazilian football player
 Bismark Charles (born 2001), Ghanaian footballer
 Bismarck Kuyon (born 1939), Liberian politician
 Bismarck Myrick (born 1940), American diplomat
 Bismarck Veliz (born 1993), Nicaraguan footballer
 Bismark Adjei-Boateng (born 1994), Ghanaian footballer
 Bismark Ekye (born 1981), Ghanaian footballer
 Bismark Ferreira (born 1993), Brazilian footballer
 Bismark Idan (born 1989), Ghanaian footballer
 Bismark Ngissah (born 1998), Ghanaian footballer